Kinda Kinks is the second studio album by the English rock band the Kinks. Recorded and released within two weeks after returning from a tour in Asia, Ray Davies and the band were not satisfied with the production.

Production 
The album was recorded immediately after the return of the group from an Asian tour, and was completed and released within two weeks. Consequently, the production was rushed and, according to Ray Davies, the band was not completely satisfied with the final cuts. Due to record company pressure, however, no time was available to fix certain flaws present in the mix. Ray Davies has expressed his dissatisfaction towards the production not being up to par. Commenting on this, he said: "A bit more care should have been taken with it. I think (producer) Shel Talmy went too far in trying to keep in the rough edges. Some of the double tracking on that is appalling. It had better songs on it than the first album, but it wasn't executed in the right way. It was just far too rushed."

Releases 

It was released by Pye in the UK on 5 March 1965, and by Reprise in the USA on 11 August 1965. The US release had a rearranged track listing and repackaged cover. Several tracks were removed, and the single "Set Me Free", released two months after the UK issue of Kinda Kinks, was unique to the album's US release. In the UK, the album was only released in mono; no stereo mix was made.

The single "Tired of Waiting for You"  was a number one hit on the UK Singles Chart. The album itself hit number three on the UK Albums Chart.

"Wonder Where My Baby Is Tonight" was released as a single in Norway and Sweden in 1966, backed with "I Need You", reaching number seven on the Swedish charts.

Legacy 

Bruce Eder, in a retrospective summary for AllMusic, wrote that the album was uneven, but that "...what was first-rate was also highly memorable, and what wasn't also wasn't bad." They also made note of some maturing in Ray Davies's songwriting.

Track listing

In all markets except the US 
All tracks are written by Ray Davies except where noted.

Side one
"Look for Me Baby"2:17
"Got My Feet on the Ground" (R. Davies, Dave Davies)2:14
"Nothin' in the World Can Stop Me Worryin' 'Bout that Girl"2:44
"Naggin' Woman" (Jimmy Anderson, Jerry West)2:36
"Wonder Where My Baby Is Tonight"2:01
"Tired of Waiting for You"2:31

Side two
"Dancing in the Street" (William "Mickey" Stevenson, Marvin Gaye)2:20
"Don't Ever Change"2:25
"Come on Now"1:49
"So Long"2:10
"You Shouldn't Be Sad"2:03
"Something Better Beginning"2:26

Original US release 
All tracks are written by Ray Davies except where noted.

Side one
"Look for Me Baby"2:17
"Got My Feet on the Ground"2:14
"Nothin' in the World Can Stop Me Worryin' 'Bout That Girl"2:44
"Wonder Where My Baby Is Tonight"2:01
"Set Me Free"2:12

Side two
"Ev'rybody's Gonna Be Happy"2:16
"Dancing in the Street" (Stevenson, Gaye)2:20
"Don't Ever Change"2:25
"So Long"2:10
"You Shouldn't Be Sad"2:03
"Something Better Beginning"2:26

Personnel 
According to band researcher Doug Hinman:

The Kinks
Ray Davies lead vocals, electric rhythm guitar; acoustic guitar ; piano
Dave Davies backing vocals, electric guitar; lead vocals 
Pete Quaife backing vocals, bass guitar
Mick Avory drums

Additional musicians
Rasa Davies backing vocals
Bobby Graham drums 
Unidentified girlfriends of the Kinks backing vocals 

Production
Bob Auger engineer
Glyn Johns engineer 
Shel Talmy producer

Charts

References

Sources

External links 
Kinda Kinks at kindakinks.net

The Kinks albums
1965 albums
Albums produced by Shel Talmy
Pye Records albums
Reprise Records albums
British rock-and-roll albums
Garage rock albums by English artists
Beat music albums
Rhythm and blues albums by English artists